The office of Prime Minister of Egypt was established in 1878, together with the Cabinet of Egypt, after Khedive Isma'il Pasha agreed to turn his powers over to a cabinet of ministers modeled after those of Europe. Nubar Pasha was thus the first Prime Minister of Egypt in the modern sense.

Egypt has a long history with a prime minister-type position existing in its governance. Under various Islamic empires, Egypt had Viziers, a political office similar in authority and structure (in terms of being second in command to the head of state) to that of a prime minister. During the Old, Middle, and New Kingdom phases of Ancient Egypt, it was common practice for the Pharaoh to appoint a second in command officer whose position is translated to as Vizier. This pattern of having a prime minister/vizier position in government was only broken for an extended period of time during Roman and Sasanian governance of Egypt, in which Egypt was directly ruled by appointed Governors.

In Arabic, the official term for Prime Minister more directly translates to 'President of the Ministers'. This is not to be confused with President of Egypt, which is a separate post.

The current Prime Minister of Egypt is Moustafa Madbouly, since 7 June 2018.

List of officeholders

See also
Prime Minister of Egypt
President of Egypt
List of presidents of Egypt
Vice-President of Egypt
Speaker of the House of Representatives (Egypt)
List of speakers of the House of Representatives (Egypt)

References

Prime ministers
Egypt
 
prime ministers